Dominique Chapuis was a French cinematographer known for his work on films like Friends, Beautiful Memories, and La mort du Chinois. He died of colon cancer in 2001.

Selected filmography 

 Beautiful Memories (2001)
 Sobibór, October 14, 1943, 4 p.m. (2001)
 Les fantômes de Louba (2001)
 Taking Wing (2000)
 Les gens qui s'aiment (1999)
 A Visitor from the Living (1999) 
 La mère Christain (1998)
 Les kidnappeurs (1998)
 La mort du Chinois (1998)
 The Kid from Chaaba (1997)
 Le géographe manuel (1996)
 Calino Maneige (1996)
 Bastard Brood (1996)
 Tsahal (1994)
 Pax (1994)
 Mina Tannenbaum (1994)
 Pas très catholique (1994)
 Friends (1993)
 The Last Dive (1992)
 My Life Is Hell (1991)
 Welcome to Veraz (1991)
 La voix humaine (1990)
 Gaspard et Robinson (1990)
 Overseas (1990)
 Love Comedy (1989)
 The Little Thief (1988)
 La petite amie (1988)
 L'enfance de l'art (1988)
 Sweet Lies (1987)
 Les keufs (1987)
 Où que tu sois (1987)
 L'état de grâce (1986)
 Willy/Milly (1986)
 États d'âme (1986)
 A Killing Affair (1986)
 An Impudent Girl (1985)
 Contes clandestins (1985)
 Shoah (1985)
 Tea in the Harem (1985)
 Nasdine Hodja au pays du business (1984)
 Black Shack Alley (1983)
 They Call It an Accident (1982)
 Countryman (1982)
 The Gatekeeper's Daughter (1975)

References

External links

French cinematographers
1948 births
2001 deaths